Ashley McCall Scott (born July 13, 1977) is an American actress and model, best known for providing the voice and motion capture for Maria Miller in the video games The Last of Us (2013) and The Last of Us Part II (2020). She has also appeared in films such as A.I. Artificial Intelligence (2001), Walking Tall (2004), Into the Blue (2005), The Kingdom (2007), 12 Rounds (2009), and Secret Obsession (2019), as well as a number of television movies on the Lifetime network since 2010. Her television roles include Jericho, Birds of Prey, Dark Angel.

Early life
Scott was born outside New Orleans in Metairie, Louisiana, on July 13, 1977, growing up in Charleston, South Carolina. She began her modeling career as a young girl and was a 1993 Elite Model Look finalist. As a teenager, she became a model for Elite Miami. She modeled internationally in fashion shows in Miami, Paris, and London, and has modeled for photos on the cover of numerous publications.

Career
First screen credit was as Gigolo Jane in the 2001 feature film A.I. Artificial Intelligence. While Scott has had supporting roles and bit parts in a number of feature films – including Walking Tall (2004), Into the Blue (2005), The Kingdom (2007), and 12 Rounds (2009) – she has had a number of lead and recurring roles on television.

In 2001, she was cast as series regular Asha Barlow on the Fox science fiction series Dark Angel. In 2002, Scott was cast as Helena Kyle / Huntress on the WB television drama series Birds of Prey.

In 2004, she played the role of Allison on Joey in the unbroadcast pilot, and was replaced by Andrea Anders for the series.

She starred as Emily Sullivan for both seasons of the CBS series Jericho (2006—2009). She was also cast as series regular Mary in the first season (2015) of the Lifetime network's comedy-drama series UnREAL.

In 2013, she voiced the character Maria in the video game The Last of Us. She reprised her role in the 2020 sequel The Last of Us Part II. It was revealed during her appearance in Retro Replay that she had originally auditioned for the role of Tess before it went to Annie Wersching.

In 2019, Scott starred in the Netflix psychological thriller Secret Obsession, which was digitally released worldwide on July 18, 2019. In the same year, it was reported that Scott would reprise her role as Helena Kyle/Huntress in the Arrowverse crossover "Crisis on Infinite Earths".

Personal life
Scott was married to producer Anthony Rhulen from 2004 to 2008. In 2010, she married Steve Hart, lead singer of the band Worlds Apart, and they have two daughters. They divorced in 2019. , she resided in Los Angeles with her two daughters.

Filmography

Film

Television

Video games

References

External links

 
 

1977 births
21st-century American actresses
Actresses from Louisiana
American film actresses
American television actresses
American video game actresses
Living people
People from Metairie, Louisiana
American female models